Veer Surendra Sai (23 January 1809 – 28 February 1884) was a native Indian as well as a regional freedom fighter from the Bengal Presidency, now Odisha. He fought against British rule in India after they dethroned the king and queen of Sambalpur State as he was the legal heir. Veer Surendra Sai and his associates Madho Singh, Kunjal Singh, Airi Singh, Bairi Singh, Uddant Sai, Ujjal Sai, Khageswar Dao, Karunakar Singh, Salegram Bariha, Govind Singh, Pahar Singh, Rajee Ghasia, Kamal Singh, Hati Singh, Salik Ram Bariha, Loknath Panda/Gadtia, Mrutunjaya Panigrahi, Jagabandu Hota, Padmanabha Guru, Trilochan Panigrahi and many others worked together and separately to counter British colonial expansion in India, preventing the British authorities from assuming control over the majority of Western Odisha region for a significant period of time. Historians have noted that Sai has received more historiographical attention than those of his contemporaries in their struggle against British rule. Many of them were tried and executed by the colonial authorities; Hatte Singh died at the Kalapani Jail in the Andamans. Lion of Sambalpur Veer Surendra Sai died in Asirgarh Jail on 28 February 1884.

Early life and background 
Sai was born on 23 January 1809 in a village called Khinda about 40 km to the north of Sambalpur, Odisha. He was one of the seven children of Dharma Singh. The family was part of the Sambalpur State ruling clan. He belonged to the branch initiated by Anirudha Sai son of Madhekara Sai, fourth king of Chauhan dynasty.

Revolt for the throne 
In 1827 ruler of Sambalpur , Raja Maharaja Sai died without an heir. The British Government installed his widow Rani Mohan Kumari as the ruler of the state.This was against the established norms where only the male rulers were acceptable to the population.As a result of which disturbance broke out and conflict increased between the recognised ruler and other claimants for the throne of Sambalpur. Surendra Sai being one of the descendants of the ruling clan , had the most prominent claim. In time Rani Mohan Kumari became unpopular. Her land revenue policy did not satisfy the Gond and Binjhal tribal zamindars and subjects who suspected loss of power to the British. The British authorities removed Rani Mohan Kumari from power and put Narayan Singh, a descendant of royal family but born of a low caste, as the king of Sambalpur. The British Government ignored the claim of Surendra Sai for succession. Rebellion broke out in the regime of Narayan Singh. Surendra Sai and his close associates, the Gond zamindars, created many disturbances. In an encounter with the British troops Surendra Sai, his brother Udyanta Sai and his uncle Balaram Singh were captured and sent to the Hazaribagh Jail where Balaram Singh died. King Narayan Singh died in 1849. By virtue of the Doctrine of Lapse, Lord Dalhousie annexed Sambalpur in 1849, as Narayan Singh had no male successor to succeed him. During the uprising of 1857 the sepoys set Surendra Sai and his brother Udyant Sai free. The resistance to British continued in Sambalpur under the leadership of Surendra Sai. He was supported by his brothers, sons, relatives and some Zamindars.

Uprising 
Sai espoused the cause of the downtrodden tribal people in Sambalpur by promoting their language and culture in response to the higher castes and the British colonial authorities trying to exploit them to establish their political power in Sambalpur region. He began protesting against the British at the age of 18 in 1827. First time he was arrested in 1840 and sent to Hazaribagh Jail. He was broken out of Hazaribagh prison by the fighters during 1857 rebellion. He moved his operations to the hilly tracts of Odisha and continued his resistance until his surrender in 1862 . Before his surrender he spent 17 years in prison at Hazaribagh and after his final arrest served a term of 20 years including his detention of 19 years in the remote Asirgarh hill fort until he died.

Attempts made to suppress him
The Indian Rebellion of 1857 collapsed by the end of 1858 and law and order was restored by the British throughout India, but he continued his revolution. The military resources of the British were pulled up against him and the brilliant Generals like Major Forster, Capt. L. Smith and others earned credit in suppressing the rebellion elsewhere in India were brought to Sambalpur to stamp out his revolution. But all attempts failed and Surendra Sai succeeded in foiling strategy of the British for a long time. Major Forster, the reputed general who was vested with full military and civil power and the authorities of a Commissioner to suppress Surendra Sai and his followers, was removed by the British authority in 1861 after three years in Sambalpur. His successor Major Impey could not defeat Sai. The British seized the entire food-stock of the rebels, stopped all resources of the supply of food and other necessaries of life for them. Major Impey abandoned the idea of violent war and cautiously followed the policy of peace and good-will with the approval of the Government of India. Surendra Sai, one of the greatest revolutionaries in history, and a warrior who knew no defeat in his life surrendered with full faith in the honesty and integrity of the British Government. However, after the death of Impey, situations took a sudden change and the British administrators revived their hostility towards the great hero.

Last days
Sambalpur was brought under the jurisdiction of the newly created Central Provinces on 30 April 1862; Veer Surendra Sai decided to surrender soon after that. However, he was said to have been disillusioned and the new setup indulged in reversal of the old liberal policy. The administrators found that the surrender of Veer Surendra Sai did not bring the revolution to an end. They stepped down to organise a conspiracy and made sudden arrest of Veer Surendra Sai and all his relations, friends and followers. Sai and six of his followers were subsequently detained in the Asirgarh hill fort. Sai spent the last part of his life in captivity. In 1884 on 23 May, Surendra Sai died in the Asirgarh fort, away from his native land.

Sambalpur was one of the last patch of land to be occupied by the British Empire in India, not counting the Princely States. This was largely due to the efforts of veer Surendra Sai. He was a very good swordsman. People of the region affectionately called him as Bira (or "Veer" meaning courageous) Surendra Sai.

Recognition
Citizens of Western region of Odisha feel Veer Surendra Sai should have been recorded with greater importance in the history of India's struggle for independence. Many important documents and papers relating to Veer Surendra Sai are said to be still existing at different archives in Bhopal, Nagpur and Raipur; and the Government of Odisha recognises him a Hero.

In 2009, The Government of Odisha changed the name of University College of Engineering (the oldest engineering college of the state) to Veer Surendra Sai University of Technology, Burla in honour of this great leader.
 In 2005, Government of India installed a statue of Veer Surendra Sai at the premises of Parliament of India.
 TheVeer Surendra Sai Medical College, ESTD- 1959, located in Burla, Sambalpur, has been named after him.
 Government of India has released a postal stamp in his honour.
 On 23 January 2009 people of Odisha as well as India celebrated the 2nd Birth Centenary of Veer Surendra Sai. On the occasion, 'Paschim Odisha Agrani Sangathan' of Bhubaneswar brought out a book titled Veer Surendra Sai edited by Dr. Chitrasen Pasayat and Dr. Prabhas Kumar Singh. Also, another book titled Veer Surendra Sai: The Great Revolutionary edited by Dr. Chitrasen Pasayat and Sri Sashanka Shekhar Panda has been published by Anusheelan, Sambalpur.
 Veer Surendra Sai Stadium in Sambalpur, Odisha is named after him.
 In September 2018 Jharsuguda became the second city in Odisha to have an airport, which was named in honour of Sai.
 VSS (Veer Surendra Sai) Market Complex has been made in his honour at Chhend Colony of Rourkela, Odisha.

References

Further reading

 Pasayat, C. (eds.) (2009), Veer Surendra Sai, Bhubaneswar: Paschim Odisha Agrani Sangathan.
 Pasayat, C. and S. S. Panda (eds.) (2009), Veer Surendra Sai: The Great Revolutionary, Sambalpur: Anusheelan.

1884 deaths
People from Odisha
History of Sambalpur
Revolutionaries of the Indian Rebellion of 1857
People from Sambalpur
Indian revolutionaries
Indian independence activists from Odisha
1809 births
People from Jharsuguda district